Coming Around Again may refer to:
 Coming Around Again (album), an album released by Carly Simon
 "Coming Around Again" (Carly Simon song), a single from the above album
 "Coming Around Again" (Simon Webbe song), a song and single by Simon Webbe